Todd R. Reirden (born June 25, 1971) is an American professional ice hockey coach and former player. He is the associate coach of the Pittsburgh Penguins of the National Hockey League (NHL). He previously held head coaching positions for the Washington Capitals in the NHL and the Wilkes-Barre/Scranton Penguins in the American Hockey League (AHL). Reirden played in the NHL for the St. Louis Blues, Phoenix Coyotes, Atlanta Thrashers, and Edmonton Oilers.

Playing career
As a youth, Reirden played in the 1984 Quebec International Pee-Wee Hockey Tournament with the Chicago Young Americans minor ice hockey team.

Reirden was drafted by the New Jersey Devils in the 12th round, 242nd overall in the 1990 NHL Entry Draft. After being drafted, Reirden went to Bowling Green State University where he played for four years. From there he played in the ECHL and IHL for a number of years before finally getting the call up to the NHL with the Edmonton Oilers for part of the 1998–99 season. Following his brief stint with the Oilers, Reirden signed as a free agent with the St. Louis Blues and had his most successful season in the NHL during the 1999–2000 season, scoring 25 points. The following year Reirden was hurt for most of the year and played only 38 games with the Blues. Reirden then played the 2001–02 season with the Atlanta Thrashers. He played his last tour in the NHL with the Phoenix Coyotes during the 2003–04 season, playing in 7 games.

In the 2005–06 season, Reirden played for the DEG Metro Stars of the Deutsche Eishockey Liga in Germany and his last season as a player was split between EC Graz of the Austrian Hockey League and SønderjyskE Ishockey in Denmark's Superisligaen.

Coaching career
Reirden's first coaching job was as an assistant coach for the Bowling Green Falcons during the 2007–08 season.

On July 31, 2010, Reirden was named assistant coach of the Pittsburgh Penguins, joining fellow assistant coach Tony Granato on the bench. He replaced Mike Yeo, who left the organization to become the head coach for the Houston Aeros of the American Hockey League (AHL).

On June 25, 2014, the Penguins announced that Reirden and Granato had been relieved of their duties. On June 26, Reirden was hired by the Washington Capitals as an assistant coach. On June 29, 2018, Reirden became the head coach of the Capitals, replacing Barry Trotz, who left the team after winning the Stanley Cup with the Capitals due to a contract dispute. In his first season as head coach of the Capitals, he guided them to a 48–26–8 record and the top record in the NHL's Metropolitan Division, but they lost in the First Round of the playoffs to the Carolina Hurricanes in seven games. After the Capitals again lost in the first round of the 2020 Stanley Cup Playoffs, the Capitals fired Reirden on August 23, 2020. A week later, he was hired as an assistant coach by his former team, the Pittsburgh Penguins.

Career statistics

Head coaching record

References

External links
 

1971 births
Albany River Rats players
American men's ice hockey defensemen
Atlanta Thrashers players
Bowling Green Falcons men's ice hockey players
Chicago Wolves (IHL) players
Cincinnati Mighty Ducks players
DEG Metro Stars players
Edmonton Oilers players
Fort Wayne Komets players
EC Graz players
Hamilton Bulldogs (AHL) players
Houston Aeros (1994–2013) players
Ice hockey players from Illinois
Jacksonville Lizard Kings players
Living people
New Jersey Devils draft picks
People from Deerfield, Illinois
Phoenix Coyotes players
Pittsburgh Penguins coaches
Raleigh IceCaps players
San Antonio Dragons players
Springfield Falcons players
St. Louis Blues players
Stanley Cup champions
Tallahassee Tiger Sharks players
Washington Capitals coaches
Wilkes-Barre/Scranton Penguins head coaches
Worcester IceCats players